Tres Cerros is a village and municipality in Santa Cruz Province in southern Argentina with a population of 28.

References

Populated places in Santa Cruz Province, Argentina